Matheus Pereira de Souza (born 21 December 2000) is a Brazilian professional footballer who plays as a left-back for Vizela.

Club career
Pereira is a youth product of Cruzeiro since 2015. He began his senior career with the club in 2020 originally signing a contract until the end of 2021. On 2 February 2022, he joined Guarani on loan in the Campeonato Brasileiro Série B. On 30 July 2022, he transferred to the Portuguese Primeira Liga club Vizela with a contract until 2025. He made his debut with Vizela in a 2-2 Primeira Liga tie with Boavista F.C. on 30 October 2022, scoring his side's first goal in the 6th minute.

References

External links
 

2000 births
Living people
Footballers from São Paulo
Brazilian footballers
Association football fullbacks
Cruzeiro Esporte Clube players
Guarani FC players
F.C. Vizela players
Campeonato Brasileiro Série B players
Primeira Liga players
Brazilian expatriate footballers
Brazilian expatriates in Portugal
Expatriate footballers in Portugal